Erbent (also known as Yerbent or Ýerbent) is a village in Ahal Province in central Turkmenistan. The village is located in the Karakum Desert. It is the largest settlement on the road between Ashgabat and Daşoguz, which are located near the southern and northern border of the country respectively.

Overview
The village-scape primarily consists of single-story buildings with adjacent yurts. A pastoral economy has resulted in the desertification of surrounding areas.

The village remains a popular destination aimed at providing tourists with an "authentic experience" of life in the Karakum Desert. A Soviet-era monument in the village center—featuring a Turkmen lady with a hung head—commemorates the death of 11 men who fell during the 1931 Basmachi Revolt in their quest of ensuring the "triumph of socialism, realization of dictatorship of the proletariat, and collectivization of agriculture."

Climate
Like most of Turkmenistan, Erbent has a continental cold desert climate (BWk according to the Köppen climate classification) with cold winters and very hot and sunny summers.

Erbent's location in the middle of the Karakum Desert means it is very dry throughout the year, although winter and spring are slightly wetter and summer is especially dry. Erbent receives  of precipitation in total, spread out over an average of 42 days per year. Erbent is also sunny year-round, receiving over 3000 hours of sunshine annually on average, with July being the sunniest month and summer being the sunniest season. Humidity is lower in the summer than in the winter, dropping as low as 25% in August. However, it rises to 74% in December.

See also

 Karakum Desert
 Darvaza, another small town along the same highway in the Karakum Desert.
 Darvaza gas crater
 Repetek Biosphere State Reserve

References

Populated places in Ahal Region